Prof. Kadammanitta Vasudevan Pillai, is a Padayani exponent from Kerala, India. He is the former Vice Chairman of the Kerala Folklore Academy, a professor in mathematics, a writer and public speaker.

Early and professional life
Vasudevan Pillai was born to M. R. Ramakrishna Pillai (late) and Parukutty Amma (late), at a small village called Kadammanitta in Pathanamthitta district Kerala on 24 May 1947. His only sister is Omana Kumariamma. From childhood itself, he was interested in Padayani and Kerala folklore. He completed his pre-school and graduated from Catholicate College in Pathanamthitta. He did his MSc in Mathematics from Ravi Shankar University Raipur state of Chhattisgarh (then Madhya Pradesh) and was the first rank holder. He completed his Post Graduation with Gold medal. He later came back to Kerala and joined as lecturer in Mathematics in various colleges of NSS Management in Kerala. He worked in NSS College, Pandalam for most of the time, till his retirement as Head of Department in 2002.
He has served as the vice chairman of The Kerala Folklore Academy from 1997 to 2001.

As Padayani exponent and writer
Vasudevan Pillai has contributed greatly to the field of Kerala folklore. He has written books on Padayani and other traditional art forms.
:

1. Padayaniyile pala kolangal

2. Padayani

3. Padayaniyude jeevathalam

4. Padayani : Janakeya anushtaana nadakam (Mahatma Gandhi University textbook)

5. Padayani : Oru ithihasa nadakam

6. Padayani : The traditional epi theater (English, but not a translation)

7. Vamsheeya sangeetha shastram

8. Ethino musicology (English, but not a translation)

9. Apasaraka bimbangalude aasura gethiroopangal  (study on Kadammanitta poetry)

10. Kadinjoo pottan (drama based on Kadammanitta poetry)

Awards
He is the recipient of State Awards for his literary and cultural contributions. 
:

 Kerala Sangeetha Nataka Akademi Award (1995)
 Kerala Sahitya Akademi Award for Scholarly Literature (1996)
 Kerala youth welfare board award in 1997
 P. K Kalan puraskaram sponsored by Kerala folklore academy and kerala cultural department. The cash award of Rs 1 Lakh along with his contributions were used to form a trust to award every year Rs10000 to a veteran ashan(Guru/Master) of padayani.

His Guru
The guru to Kadammanitta Vasudevan Pillai is Kadammanitta Raman Nair, the father of famous poet Kadammanitta Ramakrishnan.

Other contributions 
His bond with villages can be seen clearly in his works. His association with the great poet of Kerala Kadammanitta Ramakrishnan led to many valuable literary contributions.

The youth of Kadammanitta, under the leadership of Vasudevan Pillai, had formed Kadammanitta Gothra Kala Kalari through which this art form has been taught to many and is being passed over to generations.

Personal life
He currently lives in Kadammanitta. He is married to D. Omana Kumari and is father of three - Kadammanitta Manu (Mrudangam Artist), Kadammanitta Anu (Singer) and Lakshmi (Violin Artist). His company with Kadammanitta Ramakrishnan had led to the rise of many literary contributions.

References

External links 

 

Writers from Kerala
People from Pandalam
Living people
Scientists from Kerala
20th-century Indian mathematicians
Malayalam-language writers
Year of birth missing (living people)
Recipients of the Kerala Sahitya Akademi Award
Recipients of the Kerala Sangeetha Nataka Akademi Award